Harry Toulmin may refer to:

 Harry Toulmin (Unitarian minister) (1766–1823), Unitarian minister who served as president of Transylvania Seminary, Secretary of State of Kentucky, and U.S. federal judge in Alabama
 Harry Aubrey Toulmin Sr. (1858–1942), Ohio lawyer who drafted the Wright Brothers' patent application for their "flying machine"
 Harry Theophilus Toulmin (1838–1916), U.S. District Court Judge in Alabama, grandson of the Unitarian minister